The House with a Clock in Its Walls is a 2018 American fantasy comedy film directed by Eli Roth, based on the 1973 novel of the same name by John Bellairs. It stars Jack Black, Cate Blanchett, Owen Vaccaro, Renée Elise Goldsberry, Sunny Suljic, and Kyle MacLachlan. The film follows a young boy, Lewis, who is sent to live with his uncle, Jonathan, in a creaky, old house. He soon learns it was previously inhabited by an evil warlock. Universal Pictures released the film in the United States on September 21, 2018. It was a box office success, grossing over $131 million worldwide and received mostly positive reviews from critics who largely praised the cast, but said the film did not fully live up to its potential.

Plot
In 1955, after his parents are killed in a car crash, ten-year-old Lewis Barnavelt moves to live with his Uncle Jonathan in New Zebedee, Michigan. All he has left of his parents is a Magic 8-Ball they had given him, and a family photograph. Upon entering his new home, he meets Jonathan's neighbor and best friend, Florence Zimmerman.

During the night, Lewis is puzzled when he hears a ticking sound in the walls. Lewis begins exploring the house and stumbles upon Jonathan smashing a wall with an ax. Frightened, he runs away and encounters multiple household objects coming to life. Jonathan confesses that he is a warlock and Florence is a witch. The house's previous owners were a sinister warlock named Isaac Izard, (an orphaned former friend of Jonathan's who was traumatized while fighting in WWII), and his equally wicked wife Selena. Isaac and Selena had apparently hidden a clock within the walls of the house before they died, and Jonathan has been trying to find the clock and discover its purpose. Despite Jonathan's cautions, Lewis begins teaching himself magic.

On his first day at his new school, Lewis meets Tarby Corrigan, who befriends him during Tarby's campaign for class president. When Tarby wins the election, he abandons Lewis.

Lewis's mother visits him in dreams. When he laments that Tarby does not see him as a friend, she suggests that he use a spell from a forbidden book to impress Tarby. On Halloween night, Lewis performs a necromancy spell in a cemetery, accidentally summoning the ghost of Isaac from his grave.

Lewis spots Isaac in the window of a house of a neighbor, Mrs. Hanchett. He "rescues" her from Isaac and brings her across the street to Jonathan's house, but before he can find Jonathan, Isaac confronts them at the front door. He reveals that Mrs. Hanchett is really Selena, who killed Mrs. Hanchett, took her place, and used her bones to make the clock's key. It was also Selena who took the form of Lewis's mother to persuade him to summon Isaac. Isaac explains that his hidden clock's blueprints came from the demon Azazel, who had given them to Isaac as he sought relief from the visions of horror he had witnessed during the war. The clock will turn back time so that humanity never existed and undo the horrors that he had witnessed. Jonathan, Florence and Lewis are chased from the house.

Using the Magic 8-Ball to learn the location of the clock underneath the boiler room, the three return. Florence defeats a snake guarding the room while the others pursue Isaac. The clock transforms Jonathan into a baby, except for his face which he'd shielded with cards. Lewis consults the Magic 8-Ball, which says "Say goodbye". He realizes that he has to let go of the pain of losing his parents to harness his true power. He breaks the clock by dropping the ball, which blocks the clock's gears. Then Lewis blasts Isaac and Selena with magic he channels from the clock. They fall, de-age, and are ultimately erased from existence.

Lewis returns to school with more confidence and gets revenge on Tarby and his friends by magically bouncing a basketball off their faces and into the basket, impressing his other classmates. He then befriends a girl named Rose Rita Pottinger, who appears to have had a crush on Lewis. At the end of the day, Jonathan and Florence are shown picking up Lewis, the three of them now live like a regular family.

Cast

 Jack Black as Jonathan Barnavelt, Lewis's uncle and a warlock
 Cate Blanchett as Florence Zimmerman, Jonathan's best friend and neighbour who is a witch
 Owen Vaccaro as Lewis Barnavelt, Jonathan's 10-year-old orphaned nephew
 Renée Elise Goldsberry as Selena Izard, an evil witch
 Sunny Suljic as Tarby Corrigan, Lewis's classmate
 Colleen Camp as Mrs. Hanchett, Jonathan's nosey neighbor
 Lorenza Izzo as Mrs. Barnavelt, Lewis's mother and Jonathan's younger sister
 Kyle MacLachlan as Isaac Izard, Selena's husband, and an evil warlock
 Vanessa Anne Williams as Rose Rita Pottinger, one of Lewis's classmates
 The credits said the Chair had the job of Griffin Tamer, and the Griffin had the job of Chair's Hair & Makeup.

Production
Principal photography on the film began on October 10, 2017 in Atlanta, Georgia. One of the challenges for the visual effects team was building massive 10-foot and 14½-foot gears for the Clock Room sequence. Another challenge was designing the Jack-o'-lantern characters, which included input from Steven Spielberg on the final designs. The soundtrack was composed by Nathan Barr and was released by Waxwork Records on a double LP.

Release
The House with a Clock in Its Walls was released by Universal Pictures on September 21, 2018. The film was released for digital download on November 27, followed by a DVD, Blu-ray and Ultra HD Blu-ray release on December 18.

Reception

Box office
The House with a Clock in its Walls has grossed $68.5 million in the United States and Canada, and $62.9 million in other territories, for a total worldwide gross of $131.5 million, against a production budget of $42 million.

In the United States and Canada, The House with a Clock in its Walls was released alongside Assassination Nation, Life Itself and Fahrenheit 11/9, and was projected to gross $15–20 million from 3,592 theaters in its opening weekend. The film made $7.8 million on its first day, including $840,000 from Thursday night previews. It went on to debut to $26.9 million, finishing first at the box office and marking the best opening of Roth's career, surpassing Hostel in 2006 ($19.6 million). In its second weekend the film made $12.5 million, finishing third behind newcomers Night School and Smallfoot.

Critical response
The website's critical consensus reads: "An entertaining PG detour for gore maestro Eli Roth, The House with a Clock in Its Walls is a family-friendly blend of humor and horror with an infectious sense of fun". On Metacritic, the film has a weighted average score of 57 out of 100, based on 38 critics, indicating "mixed or average reviews". Audiences polled by CinemaScore gave the film an average grade of 'B+' on an A+ to F scale, while PostTrak reported filmgoers gave it 3.5 out of 5 stars.

References

External links
 
 

2018 films
2018 comedy films
2010s children's fantasy films
2010s fantasy comedy films
2010s ghost films
Amblin Entertainment films
American children's fantasy films
American comedy films
American dark fantasy films
American fantasy comedy films
American ghost films
Apocalyptic films
Clocks in fiction
Demons in film
2010s English-language films
American films about Halloween
Films about orphans
Films about witchcraft
Films based on American horror novels
Films based on children's books
Films directed by Eli Roth
Films produced by James Vanderbilt
Films scored by Nathan Barr
Films set in 1955
Films set in Michigan
Films shot in Newnan, Georgia
IMAX films
Reliance Entertainment films
Steampunk films
Universal Pictures films
2010s American films